Goodenia subauriculata is a species of flowering plant in the family Goodeniaceae and is endemic to northern Australia. It is a hairy, ascending to low-lying herb with toothed, linear leaves and spikes of small, brownish-yellow flowers.

Description
Flowering occurs around April.

Taxonomy and naming
Goodenia subauriculata was first formally described in 1946 by Cyril Tenison White in the Proceedings of the Royal Society of Queensland.

Distribution
This goodenia grows in Arnhem Land and nearby areas in the Northern Territory and on Cape York Peninsula in Queensland.

Conservation status
Goodenia subauriculata is classified as "data deficient" in the Northern Territory and as of "least concern" in Queensland.

References

subauriculata
Flora of the Northern Territory
Flora of Queensland
Taxa named by Cyril Tenison White
Plants described in 1946